The Legislative Assembly of Mato Grosso is the unicameral legislature of Mato Grosso state in Brazil. It has 24 state deputies elected by proportional representation.

External links
Official website

 
Mato Grosso